The Casa de Campo (for Spanish: Country House) is the largest public park in Madrid. It is situated west of central Madrid, Spain. It gets its name 'Country House' because it was once a royal hunting estate, located just west of the Royal Palace of Madrid. It was created in the early 16th century for use by the royal family and nobility, and was opened to the public in 1931 when it became a public park. Today, it is a popular green space and weekend destination for Madrid residents.

The Casa de Campo is linked to the Parque del Oeste by the Teleférico de Madrid, a gondola lift.

The complex was declared in 2010 an Asset of Cultural Interest by the Community of Madrid. For its part, the regulations of the General Urban Planning Plan of the Madrid City Council, of 1997, classify it as a historic park.

Overview

An amusement park, the Parque de Atracciones de Madrid, and the Madrid Zoo are located inside the park. It is common for families to spend time in the park, looking at the wildlife that may be seen occasionally seen around the park with deer, rabbits, and different kinds of birds being the most common. The park also contains an artificial lake for recreation.

From 1936 to 1939, during the Spanish Civil War, the front lines of the Siege of Madrid ran through the Casa de Campo, where the Republicans had halted a nationalist offensive in November 1936.

The trails crisscrossing the park are great for running, walking, and mountain biking. A lot of the less frequented parts of the park showcase Madrid's natural semi-arid beauty with red soil and scruffy pine trees. The altitude is elevated just like the rest of Madrid with quite a few hills inside the park.

The park has had a bad reputation of being a place for prostitutes, most of whom are not Spanish and imported for the sex trade. However, Madrid's chief prosecutor has denied the police authority to enforce a more modest dress code, despite complaints about sex workers wearing little clothing. Due to the park's size, there are still problems but the volume is a lot less with different enforcement measures in place and the rerouting of commuter traffic outside of the park.

Nowadays, the park is mainly visited by families to spend the day, cyclists or hikers, as there are many routes to explore the forest.

Flora and fauna
The natural vegetation of Casa de Campo is mainly holm oak forest, accompanied by mediterranean bushes. However, throughout its history it has undergone constant transformation, even being used as farmland in some periods and repopulated in others with different non-native tree species, mainly stone pines or cypress trees, but also others such as poplars, chestnut trees, plane trees, ash trees, oaks or willows. In 2002, 686,294 specimens (trees or shrubs) were registered in the woodland inventory of the park.

In 2000, 18 trees or groups of them were classified as Singular Trees. They are marked with wooden signs that describe their special characteristics. A 2021 winter storm, Filomena, destroyed at least a tenth of the trees throughout Madrid, and damaged an unknown amount of the park.

Many different species of vertebrates can be found in Casa de Campo: over 140 birds, 21 mammals, 14 reptiles, six amphibians and 6 fish.

Access
The park can be accessed via the Teleferico, a gondola with a pick up point inside the Parque del Oeste on the west end of Madrid. The drop-off point houses a restaurant with an overlook of Madrid, playgrounds (both inside and outside), and access to Casa de Campo's many trails. The park is connected to Madrid's public transit system, including stations on lines 5 and 10 of the Madrid Metro.

See also
Madrid Arena
Madrid Zoo
Parque de Atracciones de Madrid

References

External links
Parque de Atracciones de Madrid (in Spanish)
Zoo de Madrid (in Spanish)
Teleferico
Google maps

Parks in Madrid
Articles containing video clips
Red-light districts in Spain